Pago Pago Lounge  was a mid-twentieth century Tiki Bar named for and inspired by the capital city of Pago Pago on South Pacific Ocean island of American Samoa. Opened in 1947, it was the first Tiki themed restaurant and bar in Tucson, Arizona located in the Miracle Mile Historic District.

History
In 1947 the architectural firm of Blanton and Cole were commissioned to design the exotic Pago-Pago Restaurant and Cocktail Lounge, a nightclub at 2201 N. Oracle Road (along the Miracle Mile Strip) for business partners Bob McAffee and Homer Moore. The project included design consultation from restaurant designers Clif and Lou Sawyer (who was involved in numerous other tiki themes bars including Link Paola's Outrigger in Honolulu, Trade Winds in Wagon Wheel Junction - Oxnard, California, Moongate in Los Angeles, the South Seas in Anchorage Alaska, and the Bikini in Phoenix, and The Lanai in San Mateo, California) and was built by general contractor F.B. Pacheco.

The Pago Pago was a one-story boxy, rectangular building that featured an entrance porch designed to evoke a Polynesian palapa. The circular entrance walls were adorned with faux Polynesian deco murals. Signs made of large individual letters outlined in neon spelled out “Pago Pago”; on both the east and north walls. The lounge featured a long, curving bar with a painted night sky and irregularly arranged booths. The building was a featured location in the 1956 MGM movie A Kiss Before Dying.

The restaurant tagline was "It's Topical! It's Tropical, It's the Pago Pago.""

In the late 20th century the building was heavily modified but the original palm trees and building form survived. The building awaits restoration.

Pago Pago cocktail
It is unknown if the Pago Pago created a drink named after itself when it first opened. One recipe from circa 1963 for the Lounge's eponymous tiki drink calls for:

1 oz dark Jamaican rum
1 oz orange juice
3/4 oz white grapefruit juice
3/4 oz lime juice
3/4 oz honey
1 dash Angostura bitters

Blended without ice, poured into pilsner glass filled with crushed ice.

Other themed cocktails
In addition to the Pago Pago cocktail, the lounge developed a series of exotic tiki drinks which included: 
 Deep Purple
 Dragonet 
 La Rhumba 
 Lupa-Lupa 
 Red Opu 
 Samoa of Samoa 
 Sarong

References

Buildings and structures in Pima County, Arizona
Buildings and structures in Tucson, Arizona
Restaurants established in 1947
Tucson, Arizona
National Register of Historic Places in Pima County, Arizona
1947 establishments in Arizona
Defunct companies based in Arizona
Tucson Inn
Economy of Tucson, Arizona
1940s architecture in the United States
Modernist architecture in Arizona
Tourist attractions in Tucson, Arizona
Historic district contributing properties in Arizona
U.S. Route 80